{{DISPLAYTITLE:C14H21NO3}}
The molecular formula C14H21NO3 (molar mass : 251.32 g/mol) may refer to :

 Cyclopropylmescaline
 Methallylescaline
 1-(2-Nitrophenoxy)octane
 Pivenfrine

Molecular formulas